Speed geeking is a participation process used to quickly view a number of presentations within a fixed period of time. Speed geeking gets its name from speed dating, since they both employ similar techniques.

Method 

A large room is selected as the speed geeking venue. All the presenters are arranged in a large circle along the edge of the room. The remaining members of the audience stand at the center of the room. Ideally there are about 6-7 audience members for each presenter. One person acts as the facilitator.

The facilitator rings a bell to start proceedings. Once proceedings start, the audience splits up into groups and each group goes to one of the presenters. Presenters have a short duration, usually 5 minutes, to give their presentation and answer questions. At the end of the five minutes, the facilitator rings a bell. At this point, each group moves over to the presenter to their right and the timer starts once more. The session ends when every group has attended all the presentations.

See also

 Lightning talk
 PechaKucha
 Ignite
 World café (conversation)

Meetings